Genny Uzoma  is a Nigerian actress born in Enugu state and raised in Enugu

Early life and education
Uzoma hails from Imo State, which is a geographical location predominantly occupied by the Igbo speaking people of the West African nation Nigeria. She obtained a degree in political science from Enugu State University of Science and Technology (ESUT)

Career
Uzoma began her professional acting career at the age of 18 and was registered under the Actors Guild of Nigeria, Enugu chapter but temporary quit acting as she got a job with a telecommunications company. She subsequently resigned from the job and returned to acting. She commented on her humble beginnings, stating that she had to borrow funds in order for her to be registered as a true actress since her parents were not in support of  her choice to become an entertainer, she knew it would be futile for her to ask them for funds in order to finance her ambition.

Awards and nominations

 Uzoma won the "Revelation of the year" award at Best of Nollywood Awards (BON), in 2015. 
 Nominated For City people movie award for most Promising actress of the year (English) in 2018.

Personal life
Uzoma has stated that her hobbies and passion revolves around arts and literature.

Selected filmography
I wish She Would 
The Shopgirl
Birthday Bash
Husbands of Lagos
The Vendor
Our Society
Best of the Game
Classical Fraud
Royal Doom
Eagles Bride 
Who killed Chief
A Love story
Emem and Angie
Reconciliation
The Gateman
Baby Shower
Baby mama
Commitment Shy 
Scream 
A face in the Crowd
Caught in between
King of Kings 
Love in the wrong places
The washerman
Once upon an adventure
Bond (2019)

References

External links

Living people
21st-century Nigerian actresses
Year of birth missing (living people)
Igbo actresses
Actresses from Imo State
Actresses from Enugu State
Nigerian film actresses
Enugu State University of Science and Technology alumni